Michael Steven Casselman (born August 23, 1968) is a Canadian former professional ice hockey left wing and former AHL All-Star.  He was drafted out of Clarkson University by the Detroit Red Wings in the 1990 NHL Supplemental Draft.  He played three games in the National Hockey League with the Florida Panthers in the 1995–96 season, going scoreless.

Career statistics

External links

1968 births
Living people
Adirondack Red Wings players
Canadian ice hockey left wingers
Carolina Monarchs players
Cincinnati Cyclones (ECHL) players
Cincinnati Cyclones (IHL) players
Clarkson Golden Knights men's ice hockey players
Detroit Red Wings draft picks
Essen Mosquitoes players
EV Landshut players
Florida Panthers players
Hannover Scorpions players
Ice hockey people from Ontario
München Barons players
National Hockey League supplemental draft picks
People from the United Counties of Stormont, Dundas and Glengarry
Rochester Americans players
Toledo Storm players
Canadian expatriate ice hockey players in Germany